M. R. Kandasamy Mudaliar is an Indian politician, Textile  merchant and former Member of the Legislative Assembly of Tamil Nadu from Veerapandi constituency as an Indian National Congress candidate in 1957 election. He was born in Sengunthar family in Salem district.

References

Members of the Tamil Nadu Legislative Assembly
Indian National Congress politicians from Tamil Nadu
Year of birth missing
Possibly living people